This is a list of yearly Ohio Athletic Conference football standings.

Ohio Athletic Conference football standings

1902–1936 era

References

Standings
Ohio Athletic Conference football standings